Thirty-two species of decapod crustaceans have been recorded in Dominica, an island nation in the Caribbean Lesser Antilles. This includes eighteen species of true crabs (infraorder Brachyura); one species of hermit crab; one species of porcelain crab (infraorder Anomura); and eleven species of freshwater shrimp (infraorder Caridea).

Infraorder Anomura (hermit crabs and porcelain crabs) 
Family Coenobitidae
Caribbean hermit crab Coenobita cypleatus
Family Porcellanidae
Petrolisthes quadratus

Infraorder Brachyura (true crabs)
Family Gecarcinidae
Cardisoma guanhumi
Gecarcinus lateralis
Gecarcinus ruricola
Family Grapsidae
Geograpsus lividus
Goniopsis cruentata
Grapsus grapsus
Family Ocypodidae
Ocypode quadrata
Uca burgersi
Uca vocator
Ucides cordatus
Family Plagusiidae
Plagusia depressa
Family Portunidae
Callinectes bocourti
Callinectes marginatus
Callinectes sapidus
Family Pseudothelphusidae
Guinotia dentata
Family Sesarmidae
Sesarma miersii
Sesarma robertii
Family Varunidae
Cyclograpsus integer

Infraorder Caridea (shrimp) 

Family Atyidae
Atya innocous
Atya scabra
Jonga serrei
Micratya poeyi
Potimirim glabra
Xiphocaris elongata
Family Palaemonidae
Macrobrachium acanthurus
Macrobrachium carcinus
Macrobrachium crenulatum
Macrobrachium faustinum
Macrobrachium heterochirus

References

 Decapod Crustaceans
Decapod Crustaceans, Dominica
Decapod Crustaceans
Decapods
Dominica, Decapods